KJCK-FM (97.5 FM, "Power Hits 97.5") is a Top 40 (CHR) music formatted radio station owned by Eagle Communications, along with sister stations KJCK and KQLA. The station is broadcast from Junction City, Kansas, broadcasting on 97.5 MHz with an ERP of 100,000 watts. The station serves the Junction City-Manhattan-Fort Riley area, as well as some portions of the Topeka and Salina areas.

KJCK-FM is one of the most powerful stations in Kansas, due to its ERP. KJCK is also one of the oldest stations in Kansas. KJCK-FM is currently the most listened to radio station in the market.

History
KJCK-FM first went on the air in July 1965 as a simulcast of KJCK. This simulcast continued until the mid-1970s, when the formats split. The FM side continued with a Top 40 format, while the AM eventually flipped to country.

The station was known as "Power 94.5" through the 1990s and aired a Rhythmic contemporary format competing against (now sister station) KQLA. After that station was acquired by Power 94.5's owners (Platinum Broadcasting) in 1997, the station moved to its current Contemporary hit radio format, while KQLA moved to a satellite-fed Hot Adult Contemporary format. The station kept leaning rhythmic during this time. In 2000, the moniker was changed to "The Big Kat 94.5". A year later, the station gained a competitor when KACZ signed on the air with the same Top 40 format, albeit with a more adult-oriented direction.

The station moved from 94.5 to 97.5 in September 2002 due to moving the 97.3 frequency to Kansas City, which cost several other stations across Kansas to change frequencies (Topeka country music station WIBW-FM currently occupies the 94.5 frequency), but retained "The Big Kat" moniker after the move.

On April 1, 2005, the station changed its name to "Power Hits 97-5", which was partially intended as an April Fool's Day joke. The music direction was changed, as it started day-parting by playing more adult-friendly content (which capitalized on current mainstream pop, punk-rock and modern rock tracks (even leaning towards modern adult contemporary at times), as well as 1990s tracks) during the day, while relegating harder-edged content (such as Hip hop and R&B tracks) after 6 PM. This was done to compete against KACZ, who also had an adult-leaning Top 40 format. A new morning show, Stooks In The Morning, debuted in May 2005. This show targeted people in the 18-34 demographic and was well respected across the area as it discussed edgy content and being very listener interactive.

In August 2007, the station started leaning rhythmic again, as most of the adult-friendly content was removed. This was done due to a new program director being hired, as former PD and morning show host Matt Stooks quit in June. As of 2009, the station shifted towards a more mainstream direction.

On October 6, 2011, Platinum Broadcasting announced it was ceasing operations, and that the station, along with its sister stations, will be sold to Hays, Kansas-based Eagle Communications, pending FCC approval. The sale was approved on December 15, 2011.

Transmitter fire
On March 25, 2007, at around 11 pm, KJCK went off the air due to a fire in the transmitter. The transmitter went back on a few hours later; however, the coverage area was reduced down to at least a 6-mile radius. Manhattan residents and some residents in Fort Riley were not able to pick up the station. Stooks In The Morning did a web-only show for part of the week, while on 97.5, it was a "best-of" show. Everyone else took the day off. That Thursday afternoon/evening, the station went back to its original coverage area. Some criticized that the days they were off the air were Justin Carson's last days before moving to KZCH in Wichita the following week. Justin's last day was on Friday, March 30 (he returned in August 2008, but left by September 2009).

During the early morning hours of Saturday, May 19, 2007 the secondhand transformer which replaced the original transformer that had caused the fire ceased to function correctly. KJCK-FM again operated at extremely low power until the following Monday afternoon when a new transformer was installed. On January 11, 2008, the station put in a new transmitter which includes the most up to date technology.

Programming
Currently, Power Hits airs the Power Morning Show with Rodney & Sarina. The show airs from 5 am to 10 am. Cyndee Campbell does the midday shift from 10 am to 3 pm. Afternoons are hosted by Stooks from 3 pm to 7 pm. The Power Hour Mix show from 5 to 6 pm. Nights are hosted by Karina and Overnights with Adam Bomb.

Former DJs
Joe Liberty (1971)
JR Greely (1975-1977 PD)
Chris Favor (1974-1977 MD) 
J. Walter Scott (1977–79)
Rob Mackey (1975-1977)
Jimmy West (1978)
Cathy (Cat) Sloan (1979-1981)
Don Paustian (1975-1980)
Mark Eaton (1977-1979)
Tom Tadtman (1974-1980)
Julie Deppish (1978-1986) (Currently at iHeart Media, San Francisco)
The Prince of Darkness (James Phelps) Overnights (1979-1986) (KAB award 1983-1984 2# Non-Metro DJ Personality)
The High Shama (James Phelps ) Afternoons-Program Director (1986 -1990)
T-Mac (Tom McClain) (1981-1983)
Steve Dahle
Greg Howard
Denis Prior
Rudy Davis
Pete Eckhoff
Mark Hudson - AM Drive 1993 - 1994
The Force-Man (Gary Zahara)-Overnights (1994)
Harvey The Wonder Hamster (Kevin Harvey)-Mornings (1991-1997)-In 1996, Harvey was named the #1 Air Personality in Medium Market.
Matthew Steele-Overnights (1994-1995)
Wende Horton-Mid-days (199?-2003)
J.T. - Nights (1999-2003) (Now owns and operates Platinum Audio Entertainment in Kansas City)
Chad Allen-Mornings with Rodney (1998-2003) (Now at KYEZ, Salina, KS)
Jenny Welch- Co-Hosted Mornings with Chad and Mid-days (1999-2000)
Bradley J-Afternoons (1994-2003), Mornings (2003–2005), Afternoons (2005) 
Chris Casey- Stooks Co-Host (2005-2006) (Now working in the movie business)
Chuck Armstrong-Temporary Night Jock (2007) (Now in New York City)
Cindy Sue-Weekends (late 2007-March 2008) (Fired)
Morgan-Weekends/Intern (late 2007-April 2008)
Matt McBain- Nights (2003-2005), Afternoons (2005-June 2007), Mornings (July 2007), Afternoons (September 2007-June 9, 2008), also did Saturday mornings from October 2007-June 7, 2008; Nights (November 2012-January 2013) (now at KBGL/Great Bend
Erin-Weekends (May 2008), Afternoons (June 2008-August 2008) (Intern)
Jeri Anne-Weekends and Morning Co-Host (Stooks and Power Morning Show), October 28, 2006 – October 3, 2008 (Now working at Shawnee County, Kansas Sheriff's office)
Russell-Nights and Weekends-September 2008-June 2009
Justin Carson-Mornings (2005), Nights (2006-2008), Afternoons (March 2009-July 2009), Nights.
Matt Stooks-Mornings (2005-2007) (now at KKJO-FM/St. Joseph, Missouri and nights on KJCK-FM via voicetracking)
Mary-Nights (November 2008-August 2010) (Intern)
Kat Kasey-Afternoons (August 2009-January 2011)
Lee Oxler-Mornings- Just friends with Drew Scanlon (August 2010-March 2011) (Intern)
Justin K-Afternoons (January 2011-November 2011) 
Jenn-Nights (April 2007-October 3, 2008), Mornings (October 6, 2008-April 2012) (now at KNWS-FM/Waterloo, Iowa)
Mike Turner-Nights (September 2011-July 2012) 
Nick-Nights (September 2010-September 2011), Afternoons (September 2011-June 2013)
Kylee-Mornings
Robert Elfman-Mornings (2007-2018) (now at WGNI/Wilmington, North Carolina)

Trivia
Rodney, Morning Show Host, is still on the air at the same station since 1998. He has worked all day shifts, starting at nights, before being moved to mornings, and moved to middays in 2005.
On April 1, 2010, the station's audio was temporarily replaced by KQLA's as an April Fool's joke.

Sister stations
KJCK (AM)- "1420 KJCK"
KQLA-"Q 103.5"
 KQLA-HD2 92.7

References

External links
 Official Website
 

J.C.K-FM
Contemporary hit radio stations in the United States